Crime in the Dominican Republic is investigated by the Dominican Republic National Police.

Crime by type

Murder 

As of September 2020, the Dominican Republic recorded 705 murders according to its Citizen Security Observatory, giving the country a projected annual total of 940 killings and a homicide rate of 9.0 per 100,000 (one of the lowest in the region). This continues the nation’s unbroken decrease in homicides since 2011, following 2019’s total of 1,026 homicides.

Illegal drug trade 
The Dominican Republic has become a trans-shipment point for Colombian drugs destined to Europe as well as the United States and Canada. Money laundering via the Dominican Republic is favored by the drug cartels for the ease of illicit financial transactions. In 2004, it was estimated that 8% of all cocaine smuggled into the United States had come through the Dominican Republic. The Dominican Republic responded with increased efforts to seize drug shipments, arrest and extradite those involved, and combat money-laundering.

Robbery 
Purse snatchers and briefcase thieves are known to work hotel bars and restaurants waiting for unknowing guests to place these items on chairs or under tables. Pools or beaches are attractive areas for thieves.

The most common type of crime are drive-by robberies that are normally performed by one or two assailants on a motorcycle, scooter, or even a bicycle. The assailant will drive up and grab anything that is in arm's reach: purses, cellular phones, necklaces, etc. In metropolitan Santo Domingo the majority of the motorcycle robberies occurred between 8pm and 11pm, with 85 percent of the motorcycles involved having two riders.

Kidnapping 
There is a low risk of kidnapping in the Dominican Republic. Victims of reported cases include tourists, family members, and common citizens. Some victims have reported being abducted by men in police uniforms or similar clothing, and having been told that their identity needed to be verified. Kidnappers take victims to an undisclosed location and hold them from a few hours to a couple of days.

Terrorism 
The U.S. Department of State has assessed Santo Domingo as being a LOW-threat location for terrorism directed at or affecting official U.S. government interests. There are no known organized domestic terrorist groups. Santo Domingo experienced its first incident of domestic terrorism in 2014, when a male ignited an incendiary device on a crowded subway car, killing one person and injuring dozens. The Dominican Republic is an integral part of the Caribbean, with several international airports. As such, it is a likely transit point for extremists from within the region, Africa, and Europe.

By location

Santo Domingo 
High crime areas in the capital include Arroyo Hondo, Naco, Gazcue, Cristo Rey, Los Mina and Villa Agricola.

References